Before the Salt is a compilation album by American popular music singer-songwriter Jimmy Buffett.  It includes the entire original releases of his first two albums, Down to Earth and High Cumberland Jubilee with the addition of "Richard Frost" to Down to Earth.  It was released on Barnaby/Janus 2 BR-6019 in 1979.

The album has never been issued on compact disc but most of its songs are included on 1993's Before the Beach and all are on the CD releases of Down to Earth and High Cumberland Jubilee.

Critical reception

William Ruhlmann of AllMusic concludes his review with, "On the whole, there are some good songs on this compilation of Buffett's early work, but the music is not characteristic of the lighter tone he eventually took, and potential customers shouldn't buy it expecting his usual style."

Track listing

Personnel

 Jimmy Buffett – Guitar, vocals
 Buzz Cason – Vocals
 Bob Cook – Bass, guitar
 Lanny Fiel – Guitar
 Rick Fiel – Bass
 Sandy Goodrum – Keyboards
 Dave Haney – Bass
 Karl Himmel – Drums
 Don Kloetzke – Vocals
 Paul Tabet – Drums
 Bobby Thompson – Banjo
 Travis Turk – Drums
 Bergen White – Vocals

Track information and credits adapted from the album's liner notes.

See also
Down to Earth
High Cumberland Jubilee

References

External links
Album art and liner notes at BuffettRemasters.com

1979 compilation albums
Jimmy Buffett compilation albums